The Stalker's Apprentice is a single British television crime drama film, based on the novel by author M.S. Power, that was the first broadcast on ITV on 25 May 1998. The film stars Gideon Turner as Marcus Walwyn, a book editor who is driven to murder after reading a draft novel composed by Helmut Kranze (James Bolam), a former serial killer recently released from prison who is writing under a pseudonym. The film follows Walwyn as he embarks on a series of murders relating to Karen Scott (Natalie Walter), a young woman that he meets on the train to work, and the subsequent police investigation by D.I. Maurice Birt (Peter Davison), commander of the local police force.

The film co-stars Paula Wilcox, Peter Forbes and Liz May Brice in her breakthrough TV role. An independent review from Movie NZ said of the film; "[it] has a wonderfully methodical cool to it as we watch Gideon Turner, accompanied by a voiceover, putting into use the methodology from the killer's book. However. partway in, The Stalker's Apprentice abruptly becomes a policier as we follow detective Peter Davison and assistant Peter Forbes as they piece clues together. These scenes hold one's attention, although not as absorbingly as the stalker element. Eventually, the film works through a tight plot filled with sharp twists and considerable tension." The film was released on DVD in the United States on 7 March 2006, via Koch Media. A Region 4 release followed on 19 May 2010. The film has yet to be released on Region 2 DVD. The film is often repeated on True Entertainment as part of their semi-regular 'British Thrillers' season.

Plot
Marcus Walwyn (Gideon Turner) is a reader at a publishing firm. He reads a manuscript entitled ‘Death in Santiago’ by Helmut Kranze (James Bolam), which gives detailed accounts of how to stalk victims and commit perfect murders. At the same time, Marcus becomes fixated on waitress Karen Scott (Natalie Walters) after he encounters her on the subway. He stalks and gathers information about her, while befriending her at the café where she works. However, Karen's friend Sharon (Vanessa Hadaway) gets in the way and Marcus learns that Karen has a boyfriend, Darren (Guy Leverton). He then contrives to kill both Sharon and Darren, using the advice in Kranze's book. On both occasions, he carves an asterisk into the victim's forehead as his signature. Police inspector Maurice Birt (Peter Davison) investigates. Clues all point to the killer being Marcus but they are unable to find any direct evidence that ties him. At the same time, Marcus discovers that in reality Kranze is convicted murderer Herbert Zanker and that the crimes in the book are ones that Zanker is boasting about having conducted himself.

Cast
 Gideon Turner as Marcus Walwyn
 Peter Davison as D.I. Maurice Birt
 James Bolam as Helmut Kranze
 Paula Wilcox as Heather Walwyn
 Natalie Walter as Karen Scott
 Peter Forbes as D.S. Ray Wilson
 Liz May Brice as Heather Brazier-Young
 Vanessa Hadaway as Sharon Hayes
 Marc Bannerman as Paul Cornell
 Guy Leverton as Darren Cornell
 Michael MacKenzie as Harry Rutherford
 Marytn James as Richard Brazier-Young
 Angela Chadfield as Patricia Brazier-Young

References

External links

1998 television films
1998 films
1998 crime drama films
British crime drama films
ITV television dramas
British courtroom films
Scottish television films
Television shows produced by Scottish Television
Films about dysfunctional families
Films set in the 1990s
1990s English-language films
1990s British films
British drama television films